The Revista Pediatría de Atención Primaria (English: Journal of Pediatric Primary Care) is a quarterly  peer-reviewed open access medical journal covering pediatrics. It is the official publication of the Asociación Española de Pediatría de Atención Primaria (Spanish Association of Primary Care Pediatrics). Since 2012, articles are in English with Spanish tables of contents. The journal was established in 1999.

Editors-in-chief 
The following persons have been or currently serve as editor-in-chief: 
 Escribano-Ceruelo E, Menchero-Pinos F, Montón-Álvarez J. L. (1999-2000)
 Montón-Álvarez J. L. (2000-2001)
 Escribano-Ceruelo E. (2001-2002)
 Hernández-Merino A. (2002–present)

Abstracting and indexing 
The journal is abstracted and indexed in Latindex, SciELO, and Scopus.

Code of ethics 
The journal shares the Code of Ethics of the Asociación Española de Pediatría de Atención Primaria (Spanish Association of Primary Care Pediatrics).

See also 
 List of medical journals
 Open access in Spain

References

External links
 
 Asociación Española de Pediatría de Atención Primaria

Open access journals
Pediatrics journals
Quarterly journals
Publications established in 1999
English-language journals
Academic journals associated with learned and professional societies